Busi Mhlongo (28 October 1947 – 15 June 2010), born as Victoria Busisiwe Mhlongo, was a singer, dancer and composer originally from Inanda in Natal, South Africa.

Biography
Mhlongo drew on various South African musical styles such as Mbaqanga, Maskanda, Marabi and traditional Zulu, fused with contemporary elements from jazz, funk, rock, gospel, rap, opera, reggae and West African music. Her lyrics carry poignant messages and she had a care-free way of performance that included performing bare-foot.  

In the 1960s, she adopted the artistic name Vickie; only later did she become known by Busi Mhlongo. She was an initiated sangoma, which heavily influenced her music.  

In the 1970s, Mhlongo relocated to London, later recording with other South African artists who were living in exile, such as Dudu Pukwana and Julian Bahula. By the 1980s, she performed internationally, performing with other well-renowned artists such as Salif Keita.  

By the early 1990s, she began releasing her own individual works, with her first album, Barbentu, being released in 1993. A year later, she joined Hugh Masekela's homecoming tour.  

In 1995, Mhlongo joined Hugh Masekela in the Africa '95 festival in London. In 1998, she released her second album, Urban Zulu, which became a hit in various markets around the world and reportedly spent months in the Billboard World Music charts. She went on to release several more albums, Freedom (2003), and Amakholwa before her death from breast cancer in June 2010. Although physical-self isn't around, her energetic style of performance remains and can be seen through choreographer Somizi Mhlongo. Her music is a symbolism of the struggle for justice in South Africa. Her vocal range is incredible for she was able to go from a soft note to a booming roar. Due to her powerful activism against apartheid through music, Mhlongo was exiled therefore working and living in the Netherlands, North America and the UK. Busi sold half-a-dozen solo albums. Later during her career she became known s "Mam'Busi". During her youth, she joined the musical King Kong in Durban and was encouraged to play the drums. Her creativity launched her decision to create her band, Twasa. Her style of performance was inspired by Dorothy Masuka and Miriam Makeba, but mostly Princess Magogo.

Personal life
Mhlongo was raised in a musically inclined family in the mountain village of Ohlange. She married drummer Early Mabuza, and they later had a daughter. Due to Mhlongo's exile, she was unable to raise her daughter or attend the funeral of her husband, whose cause of death was murder.

Discography

 Babhemu  1993			
 Urban Zulu 1999	
 Indiza - Voyages Through New Sounds 2000	
 Freedom 2003
 We Baba Omncane 2009

Awards and nominations
Mhlongo was nominated for a Grammy and won three South African Music Awards.

References

External links

1947 births
2010 deaths
People from Inanda, KwaZulu-Natal
Zulu people
South African musicians
South African female dancers
Deaths from cancer in South Africa
Maskanda musicians